Seán McGarry (2 August 1886 – 9 December 1958) was a 20th-century Irish nationalist and politician. A longtime senior member of the Irish Republican Brotherhood (IRB), he served as its president from May 1917 until May 1918 when he was one of a number of nationalist leaders arrested for his alleged involvement in the so-called German Plot.

Biography
He was born in number 17, Pembroke Cottages, Dundrum, Dublin in 1886. An active member of the Irish Republican Brotherhood, McGarry was a close friend of Bulmer Hobson and was frequently arrested or imprisoned by British authorities for his activities with the IRB during the early 1900s. McGarry participated in the 1916 Easter Rising as an aide-de-camp to Tom Clarke and sentenced to eight years penal servitude for his role in the failed rebellion.

He was sent to Frongoch internment camp in Wales, but was eventually released. McGarry assisted Michael Collins in his efforts to reorganise the Irish Republican Brotherhood and, at the Volunteer Executive Meeting held in late 1917, he was elected General Secretary of the Irish Volunteers.

On the night of 17 May 1918, McGarry was arrested, along with seventy-three other Irish nationalist leaders, and deported to England, where they were held in custody without charge. The day following their arrest, he and the others were charged with conspiring "to enter into, and have entered into, treasonable communication with the German enemy". In his absence, Harry Boland was selected for the Supreme Council and became his successor as president of the IRB.

He was only imprisoned a short time when he took part in the famous escape from Lincoln Jail with Seán Milroy and Éamon de Valera on 3 February 1919. He and Milroy had managed to smuggle out a postcard, a comical sketch of McGarry to his wife, allowing a copy of the key to their cell to be made. They were later assisted by Harry Boland and Michael Collins who awaited them outside the prison.

A month later, McGarry gave a dramatic speech at a Sinn Féin concert held at the Mansion House, Dublin before going into hiding.

Throughout the Irish War of Independence, McGarry served as a commander and was eventually elected to Second Dáil in the 1921 elections as a Sinn Féin Teachta Dála (TD) representing Dublin Mid. He, like the majority of those in the Irish Republican Brotherhood, supported the Anglo-Irish Treaty and was involved in debates against de Valera during the controversy, most especially discussing the status of Sinn Féin as a political entity.

He was re-elected as a Pro-Treaty Sinn Féin TD in the 1922 general election, siding with the Free State government during the Irish Civil War. Liam Lynch and other members of the anti-Treaty IRA planned the assassination of McGarry among other TDs supporting the Public Safety Bill. As one anti-Treaty volunteer told Ernie O'Malley, "Seán McGarry was often drunk in Amiens St. and the boys wanted to shoot him and the Staters there but I wouldn't let them..."

On 10 December 1922, shortly before the first meeting of the Free State parliament, a fire was deliberately set by irregulars (anti-Treatyites) at his family home. His seven-year-old son, Emmet, was badly burned and died as a result. Seán McGarry was one of four targeted by anti-Treatyites during the December Free State executions. De Valera publicly denounced the attack.

McGarry was re-elected as a Cumann na nGaedheal TD in the 1923 general election for Dublin North. Dissatisfied and disillusioned with Cumann na nGeadhael, he resigned from the party after the Irish Army Mutiny and joined Joseph McGrath's National Party. He resigned his seat in October 1924.

After retiring from politics, he worked for the Irish Hospitals Trust.

Gallery

Further reading
 De Búrca, Pádraig and John F. Boyle. Free State Or Republic?: Pen Pictures of the Historic Treaty Session of Dáil Éireann. Dublin: Talbot Press Ltd., 1922.
Darrell Figgis: Recollections of the Irish War. New York: Doubleday, Doran & Co., 1928.
Knirck, Jason K. Imagining Ireland's Independence: The Debates Over the Anglo-Irish Treaty of 1921. Lanham, Maryland: Rowman & Littlefield, 2006; 
O'Donoghue, Florence. No Other Law: The Story of Liam Lynch and the Irish Republican Army, 1916–1923. Dublin: Irish Press, 1954.

References

1886 births
1958 deaths
People of the Irish Civil War (Pro-Treaty side)
Early Sinn Féin TDs
Irish Republican Army (1919–1922) members
Members of the Irish Republican Brotherhood
Members of the 2nd Dáil
Members of the 3rd Dáil
Members of the 4th Dáil